Sahastradhara, meaning thousandfold spring, is one of the most popular tourist destinations located in Dehradun in Uttarakhand state of India. It lies on 30.387231 latitude and 78.131606 longitude. This place is situated on the banks of the small river, Kali Gad which a tributary of Song River. The place has magnificent beauty of nature where water drips from the limestone stalactites, making the water abundant in sulpur and thus the place is known for its sulphur springs. It is sulphur water spring of relatively lower temperature than its surroundings. It is a warehouse of excellent beauty of caves, waterfalls and terrace farming on steppe by the local people. Its magnificent nature attracts people from faraway places. This place is at about 11 km from the city of Dehradun.

Ropeway
A ropeway (aerial tramway) is provided to reach the hill top in Sahasradhara to find a artificial park and a sai temple.
The Sulphur Water Springs is in Sahasradhara near Lord Shiva Temple.

Tapkeshwar Mahadev Temple
A very old Shiva temple known as Tapkeshwar Mahadev Temple along with Drona Guha (Guru Dronacharya's cave) is present in this location, providing a good mythological scenario and an essence of historical importance to the place. People visit and worship here.

Joyland
This place is also housing a manmade water amusement park and to attract the tourist from various places. Swings and water slides in the Joyland Water Park adds the fun and making this a very popular picnic spot.

Restaurants and hotels
This place has numerous hotels for stay and restaurants for the food. Having food besides nature adds up the pleasantries and keeps you fresh and healthy.

The nearby villages increase the beauty as they thrive on terrace farming. The hills cut in the form of terraces or steps are marvelous to watch and is simply a visual delight.
The main season is summer and October to March in winter, during which the water has its natural flow.

Spelling confusion
SahasRa is the correct prefix that means "a thousand", not SahasTRa. However, it is invariably misspelled as sahasTRadhara (even on traffic signs in Dehradun). Notice how the same prefix is spelled when referring to the crown chakra: "Sahasrara Chakra" or when it occurs in family names (example: Sahasrabuddhe) without a T. Also see Sahasralinga. The confusion arises because "sa" (स) merges with "ra" (र) in (स्र) which looks like "tra" (त्र).

References

Dehradun district
Springs of India
Tourist attractions in Dehradun